Saidalim Nysanbayuly Tanekeyev (Säidälım Nysanbaiūly Tänekeev; Russified:Танекеев Сайдалим Нысанбаевич); August 5, 1924 (1925), Chundzha (Shonzhy) village, Semirechenskaya region, Kyrgyz ASSR, RSFSR, USSR – April 19, 2017, Almaty, Republic of Kazakhstan. Soviet statesman and party leader, participant and disabled person of the Great Patriotic War, writer, prominent public figure of the Kazakh SSR and the Republic of Kazakhstan.

Biography

Early life 
He was born on August 5, 1925, in Chundzha village, Semirechenskaya region of the RSFSR, USSR, to a family of rural teacher Nysanbay Tanekeuly and Zhanlis Zhakypkyzy, his wife of his second marriage.

In 1940/41 academic year he worked as a primary school teacher of Uyghur RDPE.

In April 1942, at the age of less than seventeen, he graduated from secondary school with honors in Aksu village of the Uyghur district in Almaty region and then added one year to his age. On May 1, 1942, he volunteered the Red Army.

World War II 
In June–July 1942, he studied and graduated from the regimental school for junior commanders with the assignment of military rank to senior sergeant and was sent to the front in the army in the Stalingrad area.

However, in the middle of August 1942, as a warrior with a secondary education, he was recalled from the unit and sent to study at the Tashkent Military Rifle and Mortar School located in Termez city of the Uzbek SSR. In June 1943, he graduated from this school with the assignment of the rank of junior lieutenant.

From June 1943 to May 9, 1945, he participated in battles at fronts of the Great Patriotic War with breaks for recovery from injury:
 
– In July–September 1943, as commander of a rifle platoon, 212th rifle regiment, 77th Guards Rifle Division of the 61st army, he participated in battles on the northern face of the Kursk Salient, then – in offensive operations on the Smolensk direction

– From July 1944, as commander of a tank destroyers’ separate platoon of the same unit, he took part in battles for the liberation of Belarus and Eastern Poland (the 1st Belorussian Front, Operation Bagration), and in February 1945 – in battles for the liberation of Warsaw and other territories of Poland.

– In May 1945, as company commander, he took part in battles for the capture of Berlin; reached the Reichstag and signed on its wall.
After victory from May 1945 to March 1946, he served in the Soviet Occupation Forces in Germany at the Commandant's Service (he was a commandant of Stolberg), then returned to the USSR. In March 1947, he retired from the Soviet Army as disabled person of the Great Patriotic War.

Postwar 
In September 1947, he entered the full-time study of the Kazakh State University (KazSU), History Faculty. In February 1949, he went to externe status to participate in the national economy restoration.

From March 1949 to February 1950, he worked as an instructor, then (until November 1951) – a department head for Uyghur District Committee of the Communist Party of Kazakhstan. In June 1952, he graduated from the Kazakh State University with honors.

In August 1952, he was elected the Second Secretary for Dzhambul District Party Committee of Alma-Ata region of the Kazakh SSR.

In December 1954, he was elected the chairman for the Executive Committee of the Ili District Council of People's Deputies (Talgar). In October 1956, he was elected the First Secretary for Uighur District Committee of the Communist Party of Kazakhstan.

In June 1959, at the time of Taldy-Kurgan and Alma-Ata regions’ merger, he was appointed the Chief of Alma-Ata Regional Department for Culture – the time of the rise of Kazakh national culture; he maintained friendly relations with many of its personalities.

In June 1960, he was elected the First Secretary for Panfilovsky District Committee of the Communist Party of Kazakhstan.

In January 1963, he was elected a secretary of Kzyl-Orda Regional Party Committee, and in July of the same year – the Second Secretary for Kzyl-Orda Regional Committee of the Communist Party of Kazakhstan. That time he entered the correspondence study of the Kazakh Agricultural Institute, Agricultural and Economy Faculty in Alma-Ata (he graduated from four courses).

 From The "Gold" of Party article:

In February 1974, he was transferred and appointed the First Deputy Chairman of the People's Control of Kazakh SSR.

In July 1978, he was elected the chairman of the board of Consumer Society Union of Kazakhstan (Kazpotrebsoyuz). In December 1985, got retired due to pension age.

From 1963 until 1986 – a Deputy of the Supreme Soviet of Kazakh SSR continuously and elected to the Central Committee of the Communist Party of Kazakhstan.

From 1980 until 1986 – a member of the Central Committee of the World Co-operative Alliance (WCA).

Founder and from December 1988 until July 2009 he was pro-bono Chairman of the Kazakhstan Voluntary Society of Disabled Persons Non-state Union.

After retirement he got actively involved with authorship although hitherto was an editor of Rice of Kazakhstan (opening chapter, 1968) and Reflection on Cooperatives (1979) books and issued his first fiction Қиян асу (Steep Paths, 1979). A member of the Union of Writers of Kazakhstan, member if the Board of Literary Fund.

Literary Works 
 Steep Paths ("Қиян асу"). Short novel. Zhazushy, Almaty, 1979.
 Elan ("Серпiн"). Novel. Zhalyn, Almaty, 1991.
 1916. Yereuiltobe. As the case was ("1916. Ереуілтөбе әсерлері"). Atamura-Kazakhstan, Almaty, 1994.
 Neks ("Бел-белес"). Short novels and stories in two volumes. Shartarap, Almaty, 1997.
 Tortuous Path ("Иір-қиыр, бұраң жол"). Essay-novel. Almaty, 1999.
 Heart Wound. In honor of 60th Anniversary of Victory in the Great Patriotic War ("Жүрекке түскен жара. Ұлы Отан соғысы Жеңісіне 60 жыл"). Short novel. Sanat, Almaty, 2001.
 Оh, Heart, My Heart ("Жүрегім, менің жүрегім"). Book of poems. Kazakh University, Аlmaty, 2001.
 1916. Alban's Uprising in Karkara ("1916. Қарқара – албан көтерілісі"). Economy, Almaty, 2002.
 The Legend of the Cog. Murager, Almaty, 2006.
 Tortuous Path (Talk with a Great son) ("Иір-иір, қиыр жол (немеремен сырласу)"). Nurly Alem, Almaty, 2006.
 The view. Sanat, Almaty, 2007.
 What the Chronicles tell about ("Шежіре не сыр шертеді"). Arys, Almaty, 2008.

He is an author over 150 articles and essays; in 1980th he wrote a booklet in Russian Our Pedigree with the family genealogy for his great kids; took an active part in data collection for the fundamental book – "Albans’ clan genealogy Family Tree of predecessor Baidibek. Albans’ Genealogical Legacy" ("Бәйдібек Баба Алып Бәйтерек. Албан ата ұрпақтары шежіресі"). Poligraphcombinat, Almaty, 2011.

Honours and awards

Orders

Military:

Received in Peacetime:

Medals



Honorary Titles 
 Kazakhstan Elder Statesman 
 Honorary Freeman of Almaty Region
 Honorary Freeman of Panfilovskiy District, Almaty Region
 Honorary Freeman of Talgarskiy District, Almaty Region

Memory 
 In Notebook 17th of his memoirs "Nonsense weaving" Gerold Belger wrote: 

 From the article of Kenes Makhambetov, Director of Internal Administrative Department of the Ministry of Labor and Social Protection – "Honest Name and Unspotted Honor", Kzylorda Vestiaire, May 18, 2017:

 Director of International Chess Club "Opening", International Master, Honored coach of the RK O.I. Dzyuban wrote in booklet of S.N. Tanekeyev Memorial Competition:

 Bio articles about Saidalim Tanekeyev:
 Saidalim Tanekeyev. Honorable People of Kazakh Land. (Мақала Сәйдәлім Тәнекеев. Алаштың ардагер азаматтары. Көрнекті қоғам қайраткері, дербесзейнеткер). Alma-Ata's region. Volume 1, pages 90–91.
 Saidalim Tanekeyev. Revered People of Kazakhstan Land. (Қазақ жерінің зиялы азаматтары). A series of biographical collections. XX volume. Republic of Kazakhstan, pages 452–455.

Family 
Spouse: Sharbanu Tanekeyeva (April 17, 1929 – March 7, 2004). Married from 1948 until her death.
Children: Aisha (1949—2001), Aigul (1951), Talgat (1953), Aida (1954), Maksat (1957).
Grand children: Saule, Askar (Aisha); Zhuldyz (Aigul); Madina, Zhamilya (Talgat); Yermek, Daniya, Aigerim (Maksat).

Comments

Literature 
 Honorable People of Kazakh Land. (Алаштың ардагер азаматтары). Alma-Ata's region. Nisa, Almaty, 1996.
 Revered People of Kazakhstan Land. (Қазақ жерінің зиялы азаматтары). A series of biographical collections. XX volume. "Dәuir", Almaty, 2013.

References 
 Article The “Gold” of Party. A.Artsishevsky. 26.09.2005. Central Asia Monitor
 Herold Belger. Nonsense Weave. 17th notebook. 2013
 K. Makhambetov. A Good Name and a Spotless Honor. Kyzylorda News. 05/18/2017
 S.N.Tanekeyev Memorial. Chessnewsinfo. 2018
 Injured Heart. In honor of 60th Anniversary of Victory in the Great Patriotic War Жүрекке түскен жара. Ұлы Отан соғысы Жеңісіне 60 жыл). Short novel. Sanat, Almaty, 2001
 1916. Alban’s Uprising in Karkara (1916. Қарқара — албан көтерілісі). Economy, Almaty, 2002
 The upraising of 1916 in Kazakhstan: a look through the century
 Yereuiltobe
 Site of Saidalim Tanekeyev
 S.N.Tanekeyev’s photos in Google+

1920s births
2017 deaths
Communist Party of Kazakhstan politicians
Kazakhstani male writers
Kazakhstani military personnel
Recipients of the Order of the Red Banner
Soviet military personnel of World War II